Winx Club: Magical Fairy Party is a 2012 video game from Nickelodeon. It was released by D3Publisher on October 30, 2012, for the Nintendo DS and received positive reviews. The game is based on the CGI-animated episodes of Winx Club that were co-produced by Nickelodeon. It was part of a two-game partnership between Nickelodeon and D3Publisher, with the other game being Victorious: Taking the Lead.

Gameplay
Unlike most Nintendo DS titles, Winx Club: Magical Fairy Party is played vertically instead of horizontally, which requires the player to hold the DS system sideways like a book. The game is played by tapping the stylus on the touch screen.

The storyline covers a year at Alfea College for Fairies, where the player is a new student. The player designs the new fairy by choosing from hundreds of different clothing and wing designs. Through a series of minigames, the player helps prepare for an end-of-year party. Each of these games is based on one of the six main characters from Winx Club. The minigames are Bloom's Fireworks (making fireworks by matching shapes), Stella's Cakes (decorating a cake), Tecna's Poster Shop (designing and coloring posters), Aisha's Alchemy (connecting straws to mix fruit punch), Musa's Music (choosing a soundtrack by collecting music notes), and Flora's Centerpieces (decorating a plant centerpiece).

Reception
Winx Club: Magical Fairy Party received generally positive reviews. Kayla Zay of The Denver Post gave the game 3.5 out of 4 stars. She wrote, "I have to admit, the different outfits and designing cakes were surprisingly fun. The game is set up for the design enthusiast... A fully customizable game, Winx Club: Magical Fairy Party will not disappoint your little fashionista." Common Sense Media's Erin Bell gave the game 3 out of 5 stars, writing that it "is a fun dress-up game for tween girls, with hundreds of outfits and accessories to adorn a fairy character. However, the storytelling is weak, and the mini-games become repetitive since they don't scale to greater difficulty."

References

External links

Official website (archive)

1st Playable Productions games
2012 video games
D3 Publisher games
Minigame compilations
Nicktoons video games
Nintendo DS games
Nintendo DS-only games
School-themed video games
Single-player video games
Video games based on animated television series
Video games developed in the United States
Video games featuring female protagonists
Winx Club